James Andrew Lewis is a Senior Vice President and the Director of the Technology and Public Policy Program at the Center for Strategic and International Studies (CSIS) in Washington, D.C.

Life
Before joining CSIS, he was a member of the U.S. Foreign Service and Senior Executive Service, where he worked on regional security, military intervention and insurgency, conventional arms negotiations, technology transfer (including global arms sales), encryption, internet security, space remote sensing, high-tech trade with China, sanctions and Internet policy.

His diplomatic experience included negotiations on military basing in Asia, the Cambodia peace process, and the Five-power talks on arms transfer restraint. Lewis led the U.S. delegation to the Wassenaar Arrangement Experts Group for advanced civil and military technologies. He was also assigned to the U.S. Southern Command for Just Cause, the U.S. Central Command for Desert Shield, to the National Security Council and the U.S. Central American Task Force.  At Commerce, he was responsible for policy and regulation affecting, satellites, high-performance computers, and encryption. He was the Department lead for the Select Committee on U.S. National Security and Military/Commercial Concerns with the People's Republic of China. Lewis served as Rapporteur for the 2010, 2013, and 2015 UN Group of Government Experts on Information Security.

Lewis has authored more than two hundred publications since coming to CSIS, on cybersecurity, innovation, military space, and identity management. He was the Project Director for CSIS’s Commission on Cybersecurity for the 44th Presidency and led a long-running Track 1.5 Dialogue on cybersecurity with the China Institute of Contemporary International Relations (CICIR) He has testified numerous times before Congress.  Lewis earned a Ph.D. from the University of Chicago.

Works

References

External links
 

1953 births
Living people
University of Chicago alumni